Shambhu Bhattacharya (1937 – 26 January 2018) was a Bengali actor and stage artist.

Career
Bhattacharya started his acting career in theatre in Kolkata. He worked in several stage productions of Utpal Dutt, Jahor Roy and Rabi Ghosh. He was a bodybuilder from Baghbazar Bayam Samity. Bhattacharya became popular mainly for his antagonistic role in Bengali films. His performance in Sagina Mahato, Agnishwar, Sanyasi Raja, Amanush, Marjina Abdulla and Charmurti were remembered by film critics. He died in a private nursing home on 26 January 2018 in Kolkata.

Partial filmography
 Mej Didi
 Patalghar
 Neoti
 Choudhury Paribar
 Jiban Sandhan
 Laha Pranam
 Kumari Maa
 Mejo Bou
 Iswar Parameswar
 Tomar Rakte Amar Sohag
 Pennam Calcutta
 Goopy Bagha Phire Elo
 Pati Param Guru
 Beder Meye Josna
 Joar Bhata
 Debata
 Mahapith Tarapith
 Sreemati Hansaraj
 Aparanher Alo
 Agun
 Amar Kantak
 Shatru
 Rajeswari 
 Madhuban
 Abhinay Noy
 Swarna Mahal
 Kalankini Kankabati
 Nyaya Anyay
 Saheb
 Baisakhi Megh
Ekhoni
 Subarna Golak
 Manikchand
 Bancharamer Bagan
 Charmurti
 Sabyasachi
 Lal Kuthi
 Dhanraj Tamang
 Dui Purush
 Mantramugdha
 Sister
 Nidhiram Sardar
 Agnishwar
 Sanyasi Raja
 Umno O Jhumno
 Amanush
 Marjina Abdulla
 Natun Diner Alo
 Sagina Mahato
 Pratibad
 Gar Nasimpur
 Abhishapta Chambal
 Dakather Hatey Bulu

References

External links
 

1937 births
2018 deaths
Male actors in Bengali cinema
Indian male film actors
20th-century Indian male actors
Male actors from Kolkata
Indian male stage actors